Thalassodendron is a genus of seagrass in the family Cymodoceaceae, described as a genus in 1970. It grows along the shores of the Indian Ocean, the western Pacific Ocean and around Australasia.

The genus was circumscribed by Cornelis den Hartog in Verh. Kon. Ned. Akad. Wetensch., Afd. Natuurk., Sect. 2, vol.59 (1) on page 186 in 1970.

The genus name of  Thalassodendron is named after Thalassa, the Greek word for the 'sea' and for its divine female personification in Greek mythology and dendron the Greek word for Tree.

Species
As accepted by Kew;
Thalassodendron ciliatum  - Islands of the Indian Ocean; shores of Africa, Asia, Australia, Micronesia
Thalassodendron leptocaule  - Mozambique, KwaZulu-Natal
Thalassodendron pachyrhizum  - Western Australia

References

Cymodoceaceae
Alismatales genera